Bellows Free Academy is a high school, grades 9-12, in St. Albans, Vermont, USA. BFA-St. Albans is the largest secondary school in Franklin County, Vermont. There were 987 students in attendance as of the 2014–2015 school year.

The school has two different campuses. The main campus consists of two buildings located in downtown St. Albans: BFA South and BFA North. BFA South is the original building and was built in 1930. BFA North was formerly the St. Albans Hospital and was sold to the school when the hospital moved locations in 1996. Collins-Pearly Sports Complex is home to most athletics at the academy, and is located just off exit 19 of I-89, about a mile and a half from the main campus. BFA St Albans, along with BFA Fairfax in neighboring Fairfax, VT, was founded in memory of Hiram Bellows with money from Railroad stocks that he left in a public school fund for after his death.

Academics

There is no cost to attend BFA St. Albans, as it is a public school.

Media
The Mercury is a monthly newspaper written, laid out, and published by the journalism students at the academy in association with The Saint Albans Messenger.

Athletics
The namesake of the school's boys' teams is the Bobwhites, after longtime coach and athletic director Bob White. The girls' teams are known as the Comets, after longtime coach Dario "Doc" Comi.   
The boys and girls hockey teams, the softball team, girls basketball team, and the boys soccer team have collected state titles over the years. The boys varsity hockey team has won 16 state championship titles.All of the BFA athletic teams participate in Division I for sports, except girls lacrosse, and cheerleading which compete in Division II.

Notable alumni
Brett Adams, 1983, Athletic Director, Stevenson University (formerly Villa Julie College) since 1994, the school's 1st athletic director and men's basketball coach.
Michael J. Colburn, Conductor of United States Marine Band "The President's Own"
Dennis "Red" Gendron, former coach and teacher, General Manager at Grand Timber Lodge 
Matt Johnson, former professional basketball player
John LeClair 1987, NHL All-Star hockey player and Olympian

Sister School
BFA-St. Albans' Sister school is located in Moss Point, Mississippi. BFA has, on more than one occasion, held fund raisers for the city, which was heavily damaged by Hurricane Katrina in 2005.

References

Public high schools in Vermont
St. Albans, Vermont
Schools in Franklin County, Vermont